José Baptista Pinheiro de Azevedo  (5 June 1917 – 10 August 1983) was a Portuguese political figure, reformer and revolutionary. He helped overthrow Marcelo Caetano in 1974. He served as the 104th Prime Minister of Portugal between 19 September 1975 and 23 June 1976. He ran for president in 1976, and lost.

Pinheiro de Azevedo was born on 5 June 1917 in Luanda, but moved to Portugal several years later. In the 1960s, he joined the Movement for Democratic Unity and was a supporter of the Presidential candidacies of José Norton de Matos, Manuel Quintão Meireles and Humberto Delgado.

Pinheiro de Azevedo served in the Portuguese Colonial War, as an admiral in charge of the maritime defense of Angola.

After the Revolution of 25 April 1974, he was appointed to the National Salvation Junta, and was committed to the cause of democratization in Portugal.

On 29 August 1975 he became Prime Minister of the Sixth Provisional Government replacing ousted Prime Minister Vasco Gonçalves.

At the end of his tenure as Prime Minister, he was replaced for the final 30 days by Vasco Almeida e Costa, Minister of Internal Administration.  Pinheiro had suffered a heart attack on 23 June while campaigning in Oporto for the Portuguese presidency as one of the independent candidates in the 27 June presidential election.  He was taken to a hospital and was still recovering when President António Ramalho Eanes appointed Mario Soares as the new premier.

Presidential Elections of 27 June 1976 

|-
!style="background-color:#E9E9E9" align=left colspan="2" rowspan="2"|Candidates 
!style="background-color:#E9E9E9" align=left rowspan="2"|Supporting parties 	
!style="background-color:#E9E9E9" align=right colspan="2"|First round
|-
!style="background-color:#E9E9E9" align=right|Votes
!style="background-color:#E9E9E9" align=right|%
|-
|style="width: 9px" bgcolor=gray align="center" | 
|align=left|António Ramalho Eanes 
|align=left|Independent
|align="right" |2,967,137
|align="right" |61.59
|-
|style="width: 8px" bgcolor=gray align="center" |
|align=left|Otelo Saraiva de Carvalho
|align=left|Independent
|align="right" |792,760
|align="right" |16.46
|-
|style="width: 8px" bgcolor=gray align="center" | 
|align=left|José Pinheiro de Azevedo
|align=left|Independent
|align="right" |692,147
|align="right" |14.37
|-
|style="width: 8px" bgcolor=red align="center" | 
|align=left|Octávio Rodrigues Pato
|align=left|Portuguese Communist Party
|align="right" |365,586
|align="right" |7.59
|-
|colspan="3" align=left style="background-color:#E9E9E9"|Total valid
|width="65" align="right" style="background-color:#E9E9E9"|4,817,630
|width="40" align="right" style="background-color:#E9E9E9"|100.00
|-
|align=right colspan="3"|Blank ballots
|width="65" align="right" |43,242
|width="40" align="right" |0.89
|-
|align=right colspan="3" |Invalid ballots
|width="65" align="right"|20,253
|width="40" align="right"|0.41
|-
|colspan="3" align=left style="background-color:#E9E9E9"|Total (turnout 75.47%)
|width="65" align="right" style="background-color:#E9E9E9"|4,881,125 
|width="40" align="right" style="background-color:#E9E9E9"|
|-
|colspan=5 align=left|Source: Comissão Nacional de Eleições 
|}

References

1917 births
1983 deaths
People from Luanda
Prime Ministers of Portugal
Candidates for President of Portugal
Portuguese admirals